is a former Japanese football player.

Playing career
Ito was born in Kuwana on May 20, 1965. After graduating from high school, he joined Yanmar Diesel in 1984. He became a regular goalkeeper in 1989. In 1992, he moved to Nagoya Grampus Eight. He played many often while battling with Dido Havenaar for the position. In 1995, Havenaar left the club and Ito became a completely regular goalkeeper. The club won the championship in the 1995 Emperor's Cup, the first major title in the club's history. The club also won second place in the  1996 J1 League and the 1996–97 Asian Cup Winners' Cup. However, the club gained Japan national team goalkeeper Seigo Narazaki in 1999 and Ito lost his regular position.  He moved to the J2 League club Shonan Bellmare in 2000. He retired at the end of the 2002 season.

Club statistics

References

External links

1965 births
Living people
Association football people from Mie Prefecture
Japanese footballers
Japan Soccer League players
J1 League players
J2 League players
Cerezo Osaka players
Nagoya Grampus players
Shonan Bellmare players
Association football goalkeepers